The following list of Nikon F-mount lenses with integrated autofocus motor includes only Nikon F-mount lenses which fully autofocus in all modes of all Nikon F-mount digital single-lens reflex cameras with and also without an autofocus motor. Cameras lacking an integrated autofocus motor are the Nikon D40, D40X, D60, Nikon D3xxx series (the latest model of which is the D3500), Nikon D5xxx series (the latest model of which is the D5600) and all Nikon 1 series cameras with FT1 adapter. Fully supporting these cameras all AF-S (introduced 1996), AF-P (introduced 2015), and the older AF-I (introduced 1992) Nikon Nikkor lenses are clearly designated including the necessary autofocus motor. Other manufacturers have different or no designations for lenses including a focus motor. All here not listed AF lenses without an autofocus motor do work fully, but lack autofocus-function on these cameras. Instead an electronic rangefinder can be used to find focus.

Additionally all lenses in this list from Nikon and other manufacturers do integrate a CPU (microprocessor, introduced 1986) and additionally electronically communicate the focus distance information ('D' function, introduced 1992). Therefore, all lenses in this list support all Nikon DSLRs with all camera's exposure and Through-the-lens (TTL) metering modes including Matrix Metering mode, and also flash autoexposure like 3D (Color) Matrix Metering, D-TTL and the newer I-TTL also with Creative Lighting System (CLS).

Besides the quality (autofocus speed and noise, optical aberrations and other) of the lens including the way this quality is achieved (used technologies like type of autofocus motor, lens and body design and others), the main functional differences of the lenses in this list are the integration of optical image stabilization ('VR', introduced 2000) and secondly if it fully illuminates a Nikon FX (full-frame, 35mm) image sensor format and smaller sizes or if the specified maximum lens illumination is limited to the Nikon DX format with 1.5x crop factor (by default Nikon FX cameras crop the image automatically).

In June 2017, the list is supposed to be complete including 201 past and present lenses, additionally 28 compatible teleconverters and three lens extension tubes with support for integrated autofocus-motors. Listed here are nearly all recent autofocus-lenses, because all manufacturers have included focus motors in their Nikon-compatible lenses for years. The lenses are ordered by manufacturer and minimum and maximum focal length.

Nomenclature
The sequence of lens designations may differ in literature. See also full list of Nikon designations, Sigma designations, Tamron designations and Tokina designations.

Nikon AF-S/Sigma HSM/Tamron USD or PZD: The lens contains an integrated ultrasonic focus motor based on piezoelectricity, which enables quiet or low noise autofocus operation. All Nikon zoom AF-lenses have focal length encoders added.
Nikon AF-P:  The lens contains a pulse motor (utilizing stepping motors) to focus smoother and quieter than previous drive systems.
Nikon AF-I, Sigma/Tamron/Tokina: no designation: The lens contains an integrated focus electric motor. The Nikon type was produced from 1992 to 1996 and is rarely seen.
Nikon DX/Sigma DC/Tamron Di II/Tokina DX: Denotes a lens that is designed for APS-C DSLR sensors. Use of this lens on a full-frame (FX) sensor will likely cause vignetting. All full-frame Nikon DSLRs are able to detect DX lenses and crop the image accordingly by default. However, the viewfinder view is likely to be constricted.
Sigma DG/Tamron Di/Tokina FX: A lens for fullframe DSLRs (FX) or analog film. No special designation for Nikon NIKKOR. All fullframe lenses can be fully used on DX DSLRs with the advantage of reduced vignetting.
Nikon VR/Sigma OS/Tamron VC/Tokina VCM: Optical image stabilization, Nikon designation 'Vibration Reduction', indicated by green background, a system used to compensate for vibration and other camera movement.
Nikon D, Sigma/Tamron/Tokina: no designation: The lens is fitted with a CPU and additionally a digital sensor that tells the camera the distance at which it is focused, to allow for better exposure calculation. Although some Nikon DSLRs will not do any exposure metering at all without a 'CPU' lens, all lenses in this list from Nikon and other manufacturers support compatible CPU and 'D' function.
Nikon G, Sigma/Tamron/Tokina: no designation: The lens is not fitted with an aperture ring, and is thus incompatible with most old Nikon film SLR bodies. All G-type lenses are also D-type.
All IF: The lens utilises an internal focus mechanism, which does not extend or rotate the front optical element.
Nikon ED/Sigma APO/Tamron (X)LD/Tokina SD: Indicates that the lens is fitted with Extra-Low Dispersion glass, which aids in reducing chromatic aberration and flare.
† : Lens is out of production and is not or extremely rarely available as new.

Nikon lenses

Primes

Wide-angle
Nikon AF-S Nikkor 20mm 1.8G ED
Nikon AF-S Nikkor 24mm 1.4G ED
Nikon AF-S Nikkor 24mm 1.8G ED
Nikon AF-S Nikkor 28mm 1.8G
Nikon AF-S Nikkor 28mm 1.4E ED

Mid-range
Nikon AF-S DX Nikkor 35mm 1.8G
Nikon AF-S Nikkor 35mm 1.4G
Nikon AF-S Nikkor 35mm 1.8G
Nikon AF-S Nikkor 50mm 1.4G
Nikon AF-S Nikkor 50mm 1.8G
Nikon AF-S Nikkor 58mm 1.4G

Telephoto
Nikon AF-S Nikkor 85mm 1.4G
Nikon AF-S Nikkor 85mm 1.8G
Nikon AF-S Nikkor 105mm 1.4E ED
Nikon AF-S Nikkor 200mm 2G VR IF-ED
Nikon AF-S Nikkor 200mm 2G ED VR II
Nikon AF-I Nikkor 300mm 2.8D IF-ED†
Nikon AF-S Nikkor 300mm 2.8G VR IF-ED
Nikon AF-S Nikkor 300mm 2.8G ED VR II
Nikon AF-S Nikkor 300mm 4E PF ED VR
Nikon AF-S Nikkor 300mm 4D IF-ED

Super-telephoto
Nikon AF-I Nikkor 400mm 2.8D IF-ED†
Nikon AF-S Nikkor 400mm 2.8D IF-ED†
Nikon AF-S Nikkor 400mm 2.8D IF-ED II†
Nikon AF-S Nikkor 400mm 2.8G VR IF-ED
Nikon AF-S Nikkor 400mm 2.8E FL ED VR
Nikon AF-I Nikkor 500mm 4D IF-ED´†
Nikon AF-S Nikkor 500mm 4D IF-ED†
Nikon AF-S Nikkor 500mm 4D IF-ED II†
Nikon AF-S Nikkor 500mm 4G VR IF-ED
Nikon AF-S Nikkor 500mm 5.6E PF ED VR
Nikon AF-I Nikkor 600mm 4D IF-ED†
Nikon AF-S Nikkor 600mm 4D IF-ED†
Nikon AF-S Nikkor 600mm 4D IF-ED II†
Nikon AF-S Nikkor 600mm 4G VR IF-ED
Nikon AF-S Nikkor 800mm 5.6E FL ED VR

Macro
Nikon AF-S DX Micro-Nikkor 40mm 2.8G
Nikon AF-S Micro-Nikkor 60mm 2.8G IF-ED
Nikon AF-S DX Micro-Nikkor 85mm 3.5G ED VR
Nikon AF-S Micro-Nikkor 105mm 2.8G VR IF-ED

Zooms

Fisheye
Nikon AF-S Fisheye Nikkor 8–15mm 3.5–4.5E ED

Wide-angle
Nikon AF-P DX Nikkor 10–20mm 4.5-5.6G VR
Nikon AF-S DX Zoom-Nikkor 10-24mm f/3.5-4.5G ED
Nikon AF-S Zoom-Nikkor DX 12-24mm 4G IF-ED
Nikon AF-S Zoom-Nikkor 14-24mm 2.8G IF-ED
Nikon AF-S Zoom-Nikkor 16-35mm 4G ED VR
Nikon AF-S Zoom-Nikkor 17-35mm 2.8D IF-ED
Nikon AF-S Zoom-Nikkor 18-35mm 3.5-4.5G ED

Mid-range
Nikon AF-S Zoom-Nikkor 16–80mm 2.8–4E DX VR 
Nikon AF-S DX Zoom-Nikkor 16-85mm VR 3.5-5.6G IF-ED 
Nikon AF-S DX Zoom-Nikkor 17-55mm 2.8G IF-ED
Nikon AF-S DX Zoom-Nikkor 18-55mm 3.5-5.6G ED†
Nikon AF-S DX Zoom-Nikkor 18-55mm 3.5-5.6G ED II†
Nikon AF-S DX Zoom-Nikkor 18-55mm 3.5-5.6G VR†
Nikon AF-S DX Zoom-Nikkor 18-55mm 3.5-5.6G VR II
Nikon AF-P DX Nikkor 18–55mm 3.5-5.6G VR
Nikon AF-P DX Nikkor 18–55mm 3.5-5.6G
Nikon AF-S DX Zoom-Nikkor 18-70mm 3.5-4.5G IF-ED
Nikon AF-S Zoom-Nikkor 24-70mm 2.8G IF-ED
Nikon AF-S Zoom-Nikkor 24-85mm 3.5-4.5G IF-ED
Nikon AF-S Zoom-Nikkor 24–85mm 3.5-4.5G ED VR IF
Nikon AF-S Zoom-Nikkor 24-120mm 3.5-5.6G VR IF-ED
Nikon AF-S Zoom-Nikkor 24-120mm 4G ED VR
Nikon AF-S Zoom-Nikkor 28-70mm 2.8D IF-ED

Super-zoom
Nikon AF-S DX Zoom-Nikkor 18-105mm f/3.5-5.6G ED VR
Nikon AF-S DX Zoom-Nikkor 18-135mm 3.5-5.6G IF-ED
Nikon AF-S DX Zoom-Nikkor 18-140mm f/3.5-5.6G ED VR
Nikon AF-S Zoom-Nikkor 18-200mm 3.5-5.6G DX VR IF-ED
Nikon AF-S Zoom-Nikkor 18-200mm 3.5-5.6G ED-IF VR DX II
Nikon AF-S Zoom-Nikkor 18–300mm 3.5-5.6G DX ED VR IF
Nikon AF-S Zoom-Nikkor 18–300mm 3.5-6.3G DX ED VR
Nikon AF-S Zoom-Nikkor 28-300mm 3.5-5.6G ED VR

Telephoto
Nikon AF-S DX Zoom-Nikkor 55-200mm 4-5.6G ED†
Nikon AF-S DX Zoom-Nikkor 55-200mm 4-5.6G VR IF-ED†
Nikon AF-S DX Nikkor 55-200mm 4-5.6G ED VR II
Nikon AF-S DX Zoom-Nikkor 55-300mm 4.5-5.6G ED VR
Nikon AF-S Zoom-Nikkor 70-200mm 2.8G VR IF-ED
Nikon AF-S Zoom-Nikkor 70-200mm 2.8G ED VR II
Nikon AF-S Nikkor 70-200mm 2.8E FL ED VR
Nikon AF-S Zoom-Nikkor 70-200mm 4G ED VR
Nikon AF-S Zoom-Nikkor 70-300mm 4.5-5.6G VR IF-ED
Nikon AF-P DX Nikkor 70-300mm 4.5-6.3G ED
Nikon AF-P DX Nikkor 70-300mm 4.5-6.3G ED VR
Nikon AF Zoom-Nikkor 80-200mm 2.8D ED†

Super-telephoto
Nikon AF-S Zoom-Nikkor 80-400mm 4.5-5.6G ED VR
Nikon AF-S Zoom-Nikkor 200-400mm 4G VR IF-ED†
Nikon AF-S Zoom-Nikkor 200-400mm 4G ED VR II
Nikon AF-S Zoom-Nikkor 180–400 4E TC1.4 FL ED VR
Nikon AF-S Zoom-Nikkor 200-500mm 5.6E ED VR

Teleconverter

Nikon AF-S Teleconverter TC-20E III
Nikon AF-S Teleconverter TC800-1.25E ED
Nikon AF-S Teleconverter TC-14E II
Nikon AF-S Teleconverter TC-14E III (announced, not yet available)
Nikon AF-S Teleconverter TC-17E II
Nikon AF-S Teleconverter TC-20E II
Nikon AF-I Teleconverter TC-14E†
Nikon AF-I Teleconverter TC-20E†

Nikon notes:

Sigma lenses

Primes

Fisheye
Sigma 4.5mm 2.8 EX DC Circular Fisheye HSM
Sigma 10mm 2.8 EX DC HSM Diagonal fisheye

Wide-angle
Sigma 14mm 2.8 EX HSM RF APO†
Sigma 14mm 1.8 DG HSM "A"
Sigma 20mm 1.4 DG HSM "A"
Sigma 24mm 1.4 DG HSM "A"

Mid-range
Sigma 30mm 1.4 EX DC HSM
Sigma 30mm 1.4 DC HSM "A"
Sigma 35mm 1.4 DG HSM "A"
Sigma 50mm 1.4 EX DG HSM
Sigma 50mm 1.4 DG HSM "A"

Telephoto
Sigma 85mm 1.4 EX DG HSM
Sigma 85mm 1.4 DG HSM "A"
Sigma 135mm 1.8 DG HSM "A"
Sigma 300mm 2.8 EX DG APO HSM

Super-telephoto
Sigma 500mm 4 DG HSM OS "S"
Sigma 500mm 4.5 EX DG HSM APO
Sigma 800mm 5.6 EX DG HSM APO

Macro
Sigma 28mm 1.8 EX DG Macro
Sigma 105mm 2.8 Macro EX DG OS HSM
Sigma 150mm 2.8 APO Macro EX DG OS HSM
Sigma 150mm 2.8 APO EX DG HSM Macro
Sigma 180mm 3.5 APO EX DG IF HSM Macro†
Sigma 180mm 2.8 EX DG OS HSM APO Macro

Zooms

Wide-angle
Sigma 8-16mm 4.5–5.6 DC HSM
Sigma 10–20mm 3.5 EX DC HSM
Sigma 10-20mm 4–5.6 EX DC HSM
Sigma 12–24mm 4.5–5.6 EX DG ASPHERICAL HSM
Sigma 12–24mm 4.5–5.6 DG HSM II
Sigma 12-24mm 4 DG HSM "A"
Sigma 17–35mm 2.8–4 EX DG ASPHERICAL HSM†

Mid-range
Sigma 17-50mm 2.8 EX DC OS HSM
Sigma 17–70mm 2.8-4.5 DC Macro HSM†
Sigma 17–70mm 2.8-4.5 DC HSM "for Nikon Only†
Sigma 17–70mm 2.8–4 DC Macro OS HSM
Sigma 17–70mm 2.8–4 DC Macro OS HSM "C"
Sigma 18–35mm 1.8 DC HSM "A"
Sigma 18-50mm 2.8 EX DC HSM Macro†
Sigma 18–50mm 2.8 EX DC HSM "for Nikon only†
Sigma 18-50mm 2.8-4.5 DC OS HSM
Sigma 18–50mm 3.5-5.6 DC HSM
Sigma 24-35mm 2 DG HSM "A"
Sigma 24–70mm 2.8 EX DG HSM
Sigma 24-105mm 4 DG OS HSM "A"

Super-zoom
Sigma 18-125mm 3.8-5.6 DC OS HSM
Sigma 18-200mm 3.5-6.3 DC???
Sigma 18-200mm 3.5-6.3 DC OS†???
Sigma 18-200mm 3.5-6.3 DC OS HSM
Sigma 18-200mm 3.5-6.3 II DC OS HSM
Sigma 18-200mm 3.5-6.3 DC Macro OS HSM "C"
Sigma 18-250mm 3.5-6.3 DC OS HSM
Sigma 18-250mm 3.5-6.3 DC Macro OS HSM
Sigma 18-300mm 3.5-6.3 DC Macro OS HSM "C"

Telephoto
Sigma 50-100mm 1.8 DC HSM "A"
Sigma 50-150mm 2.8 APO EX DC HSM†
Sigma 50-150mm 2.8 APO II EX DC HSM
Sigma 50-150mm 2.8 EX DC APO OS HSM
Sigma 50-200mm 4-5.6 DC OS HSM
Sigma 55-200mm 4-5.6 DC HSM (685955)
Sigma 70-200mm 2.8 EX DG OS HSM
Sigma 70-200mm 2.8 APO EX DG HSM Macro
Sigma 70-300mm 4.0-5.6 DG†???
Sigma 70-300mm 4.0-5.6 DG APO Macro
Sigma 70-300mm 4-5.6 DG Macro
Sigma 100-300mm 4 APO EX DG HSM†
Sigma 100-400mm 5-6.3 DG HSM OS "C"
Sigma 120-300mm 2.8 APO EX DG HSM
Sigma 120-300mm 2.8 APO EX DG OS HSM
Sigma 120-300mm 2.8 DG OS HSM "S"

Super-telephoto
Sigma 50-500mm 4-6.3 APO EX DG HSM
Sigma 50-500mm 4.5-6.3 DG OS HSM
Sigma 80-400mm 4-5.6 EX OS†???
Sigma 80-400mm 4.5-5.6 EX DG APO OS???
Sigma 120-400mm 4.5-5.6 DG OS APO HSM
Sigma150-500mm 5-6.3 DG OS APO HSM
Sigma 150-600mm 5-6.3 DG OS HSM "C"
Sigma 150-600mm 5-6.3 DG OS HSM "S"
Sigma 200-500mm 2.8 APO EX DG
Sigma 300–800 5.6 APO EX DG HSM

Teleconverter
Sigma TELE CONVERTER TC-1401 1.4x
Sigma TELE CONVERTER TC-2001 2.0x
Sigma TELE CONVERTER APO EX DG 1.4x
Sigma TELE CONVERTER APO EX DG 2.0x

Sigma notes:

Tamron lenses

Primes

Mid-range
 Tamron 35mm 1.8 Di VC USD (model F012)
 Tamron 45mm 1.8 Di VC USD (model F013)

Telephoto
 Tamron 85mm 1.8 Di VC USD (model F016)

Macro
Tamron SP AF 60mm 2 Di II LD [IF] Macro 1:1 (model G005NII)
Tamron SP AF 90mm 2.8 Di Macro 1:1 (model 272ENII)
Tamron SP 90mm 2.8 Di VC USD Macro 1:1 (model F004N)
Tamron SP 90mm 2.8 Di Macro 1:1 VC USD (model F017)

Zooms

Wide-angle zoom
Tamron SP AF 10-24mm 3.5-4.5 Di II LD Aspherical [IF] (model B001NII)
Tamron 10-24mm 3.5-4.5 Di II VC HLD (model B023)
Tamron SP 15-30mm 2.8 Di VC USD (model A012N)

Mid-range zoom
Tamron SP AF 17-50mm 2.8 XR Di II LD Aspherical [IF] (model A16NII)
Tamron SP AF 17-50mm 2.8 XR Di II VC LD Aspherical [IF] (model B005NII)
Tamron SP 24-70mm 2.8 Di VC USD (model A007N)
Tamron SP 24-70mm 2.8 Di VC USD G2 (model A032N)
Tamron SP AF 28-75mm 2.8 XR Di LD Aspherical [IF] Macro (model A09NII)

Super-zoom
Tamron 16-300mm 3.5-6.3 Di II VC PZD Macro (model B016N)
Tamron AF 18-200mm 3.5-6.3 XR Di II LD Aspherical [IF] (model A14NII)
Tamron AF 18-250mm 3.5-6.3 Di II LD Aspherical [IF] Macro (model A18NII)
Tamron AF 18-270mm 3.5-6.3 Di II VC LD Aspherical [IF] Macro (model B003NII)
Tamron 18-270mm 3.5-6.3 Di II VC PZD (model B008N)
Tamron 18-400mm 3.5-6.3 Di II VC HLD (model B028)
Tamron AF 28-300mm 3.5-6.3 XR Di VC LD Aspherical [IF] (model A20NII)
Tamron 28-300mm 3.5-6.3 Di VC PZD (model A010N)

Telephoto zoom
Tamron AF 55-200mm 4-5.6 Di II LD Macro (model A15NII)
Tamron SP AF 70-200mm 2.8 Di LD [IF] Macro (model A001NII)
Tamron SP 70-200mm 2.8 Di VC USD (model A009N)
Tamron SP 70-200mm 2.8 Di VC USD G2 (model A025)
Tamron AF 70-300mm 4-5.6 Di LD Macro 1:2 (model A17NII)
Tamron SP 70-300mm 4-5.6 Di VC USD (model A005NII)

Super-telephoto zoom
Tamron 100-400mm 4.5-6.3 Di VC USD (model A035)
Tamron SP 150-600mm 5-6.3 Di VC USD (model A011N)
Tamron SP 150-600mm 5-6.3 Di VC USD G2 (model A022)

Teleconverter
Tamron SP Pro 1.4x (model ?N)
Tamron SP Pro 2x (model ?N)

Tamron notes:

Tokina lenses

Wide-angle zoom
Tokina 10-17mm 3.5-4.5 fisheye DX AT-X
Tokina 11-16mm 2.8 AT-X 116 PRO DX II
Tokina 11-16mm 2.8 AT-X 116 PRO DX "{MPN T4111603}"
Tokina 11-20mm 2.8 AT-X PRO SD (IF) DX
Tokina 12-24mm 4 AT-X 124 PRO DX II
Tokina 12-28mm 4 AT-X PRO DX (MPN 4961607696675)
Tokina 16-28mm 2.8 AT-X PRO FX
Tokina 17-35mm 4 AT-X PRO FX

Telephoto zoom
 Tokina 70-200mm 4 AT-X PRO FX VCM-S
Tokina notes:

Yongnuo lenses

Prime
 Yongnuo YN 100mm 2.0
 Yongnuo YN 85mm 1.8
 Yongnuo YN 50mm 1.8
 Yongnuo YN 50mm 1.4
 Yongnuo YN 40mm 2.8
 Yongnuo YN 35mm 2.0
 Yongnuo YN 14mm 2.8

Kenko lenses

Teleconverter

Kenko Teleplus Pro 300 1.4x†
Kenko Teleplus Pro 300 DG 1.4x
Kenko TelePlus PRO 300 AF DGX 1.4x
Kenko Teleplus Pro 300 2x†
Kenko Teleplus Pro 300 DG 2x
Kenko TelePlus PRO 300 AF DGX 2x
Kenko Teleplus Pro 300 3x†
Kenko Teleplus Pro 300 DG 3x
Kenko TelePlus MC4 AF DGX 1.4x
Kenko Teleplus MC4 AF DG 2x
Kenko TelePlus MC4 AF DGX 2x
Kenko Teleplus MC7 AF DG 2x
Kenko TelePlus MC7 AF DGX 2x
Kenko Teleplus K1.5 AF DG 1.5x

Extension tubes

Kenko AUTO EXTENSION TUBE SET DG 12, 20 and 36mm
Kenko EXTENSION RING UNIPLUS TUBE DG 12
Kenko EXTENSION RING UNIPLUS TUBE DG 25

Kenko notes:

See also
Camera lens
Lenses for SLR and DSLR cameras
Photographic lens design
 Fixed focal length/prime lens
 Wide-angle lens
 Telephoto lens
 Macro lens

References

External links / reviews
 DxOMark Camera Lens Ratings Camera Lens Reviews, Ratings and database (needs Flash)
 Nikon Lens Tests and Reviews Slrgear.com
  All tests/reviews Photozone
  Nikon F-mount lens reviews Lenstip
 Lens Reviews Dpreview
 Interchangeable Lenses Photography Equipment Reviews ePHOTOzine
 Nikon focal length simulator Nikon; needs Flash
 Nikon Lenses Reviews and Advise Any Shot Pro

Lists of photography topics